Joshua Alan Rutledge (born April 21, 1989) is an American former professional baseball infielder. He played in Major League Baseball (MLB) for the Colorado Rockies and Boston Red Sox between 2012 and 2017.

Amateur career 
Rutledge attended Cullman High School, where he was a four-year starter on the baseball team. In 2006, he had a batting average of .436 with five home runs and 33 runs batted in (RBIs). Cullman was the runner-up in the Class 5A state championship. In 2007, his senior season, Rutledge hit .454 with 12 home runs and 69 RBI, and he helped his team win the state championship. The Birmingham News and the Alabama Sports Writers Association named him the Class 5A Player of the Year.

Ruledge enrolled at the University of Alabama and played shortstop for the Alabama Crimson Tide baseball team. In 2008, as a freshman, he started 61 games and led the team in batting average (.369), hits (99), runs scored (62), and stolen bases (16). He became the second freshman to ever lead the team in hitting. From March 26 to May 10, he had a 28-game hitting streak, the third-longest in school history. In 30 SEC games, he batted .406, and his 56 hits led the league. The following season, Rutledge batted .305 with five home runs and 44 RBIs. He was named to the All-SEC first team.

In 2008 and 2009, he played collegiate summer baseball in the Cape Cod Baseball League for the Yarmouth-Dennis Red Sox.

Professional career

Colorado Rockies 
The Colorado Rockies selected Rutledge in the third round of the 2010 Major League Baseball Draft, and he signed with the team on June 25. That season, he played 11 games for the Northwest League's Tri-City Dust Devils. The following season, he played for the Modesto Nuts of the California League. He batted .348 with 9 home runs and 71 RBI and was named the league's player of the week twice. Rutledge was then moved up to the Tulsa Drillers of the Class AA Texas League in 2012. He hit .308 with 13 home runs and 35 RBI.

Rutledge was called up to the major league Rockies in 2012 to play shortstop while Troy Tulowitzki was injured. Rutledge made his MLB debut on July 13. In his first 145 at bats, he batted .345 with 24 extra base hits. Towards the end of the season, he injured his quadriceps and batted .197 in September. He finished his first major league season with a .274 batting average, 8 home runs, and 37 RBI. A natural shortstop, Rutledge began playing other infield positions in 2014.

Los Angeles Angels of Anaheim 
On December 11, 2014, the Rockies traded Rutledge to the Los Angeles Angels of Anaheim for Jairo Díaz. Rutledge spent half of the season in Triple-A with the Salt Lake City Bees, hitting .286 with 6 home runs and 34 RBI in 81 games before being traded to the Boston Red Sox in July 2015.

Boston Red Sox 
On July 27, 2015, the Angels traded Rutledge to the Boston Red Sox for Shane Victorino and $3.8M in cash considerations. He was designated for assignment on November 30. The Red Sox selected his contract from Triple-A Pawtucket in April 2016 after an injury to Pablo Sandoval. Rutledge injured his knee in June and was placed on the 15-day disabled list. On July 14, the team moved Rutledge to the 60-day DL.

Second stint with the Rockies 
On November 4, 2016, Rutledge elected free agency after declining an outright assignment to Triple-A. He signed a minor league contract with the Colorado Rockies on November 23.

Second stint with the Red Sox 
On December 8, 2016, the Red Sox selected Rutledge from the Rockies with the 26th pick of the Rule 5 draft.

San Francisco Giants 
On December 21, 2017, Rutledge signed a minor league contract with the San Francisco Giants. He was released on June 27, 2018. 

Rutledge retired following the conclusion of the 2018 season.

Personal life 
Rutledge was born to Tony and Cheryl Rutledge in Cullman, Alabama, on April 21, 1989. In 2013, he married Laura McKeeman (who took Rutledge's name upon marriage), a reporter and host for ESPN and the SEC Network. On October 2, 2019, his wife gave birth to a daughter.

See also
Rule 5 draft results

References

External links 

1989 births
Living people
People from Cullman, Alabama
Baseball players from Alabama
Major League Baseball infielders
Colorado Rockies players
Boston Red Sox players
Alabama Crimson Tide baseball players
Yarmouth–Dennis Red Sox players
Tri-City Dust Devils players
Modesto Nuts players
Tulsa Drillers players
Colorado Springs Sky Sox players
Arizona League Angels players
Salt Lake Bees players
Portland Sea Dogs players
Pawtucket Red Sox players
Sacramento River Cats players